Yahoo! Green was a website created by Yahoo! that gathered news, ideas, and discussion about ways to promote an environmentally conscious lifestyle. It included numerous ideas on conserving natural resources and limiting consumption and waste.

Subheadings and features
One of the main subheadings was a news board called "Climate Change News." This gathered many news items, from around the World, which were related to climate change on a variety of levels. It constituted of a significant appearance of climate change news as a separate news category at a major website.

The site also links to Yahoo! Answers and displays related questions and answers from Yahoo users. This constitutes just one way of enabling users to add content.

Closure
The site's environmental content was merged into Yahoo! Shine at the start of 2012, with minimal to no updates. In early 2014, Yahoo! Shine was closed and some of the content redirected to Yahoo! Health.

See also 
 Environmentalism
 Green politics

External links

References

"Lights out for Yahoo's Shine site, Xobni email apps, other products" PCWorld, Jul 2, 2014

Green
American political websites
American environmental websites